The 1958 BYU Cougars football team was an American football team that represented Brigham Young University (BYU) in the Skyline Conference during the 1958 NCAA University Division football season. In their third and final season under head coach Hal Kopp, the Cougars compiled an overall record of 6–4 with a mark of 5–2 against conference opponents, finished third in the Skyline, and outscored opponents by a total of 189 to 150.

The team's statistical leaders included Wayne Startin with 332 passing yards, Weldon Jackson with 698 rushing yards and 698 yards of total offense, Nyle McFarlane with 42 points, and R. K. Brown with 177 receiving yards.

Schedule

References

BYU
BYU Cougars football seasons
BYU Cougars football